Kiyevskaya is a station on the Filyovskaya line of the Moscow Metro (though it was originally part of the Arbatsko–Pokrovskaya line). It initially opened in 1937 and closed in 1953 when the new Kiyevskaya station, intended to replace it, was completed. Due to a change of plans, however, it reopened after only five years as part of the new Filyovskaya line.  The original architect was Dmitry Chechulin.

Kiyevskaya features tall, octagonal pillars topped with elaborate capitals. The pillars were originally faced with Armenian onyx, but this was replaced with yellowish Gazgan marble after ten years. The platform is intricately patterned with Ukrainian designs executed in red, white, and gray granite. The three rows of circular ceiling coffers originally housed incandescent light fixtures but these were abandoned in favor of the current three-bladed fluorescent lamps in the 1960s.

Between Kiyevskaya and Smolenskaya is the Smolensky Metro Bridge, which spans the Moskva River. The bridge was built in 1937 and was the first above-ground section of the Metro.

Transfers
From this station, passengers can transfer to Kiyevskaya on the Arbatsko–Pokrovskaya line and Kiyevskaya on the Koltsevaya line.

Moscow Metro stations
Railway stations in Russia opened in 1937
Filyovskaya Line
Railway stations located underground in Russia